The 32nd National Assembly of Quebec was the provincial legislature in Quebec, Canada that was elected in the 1981 Quebec general election. It sat for a total of five sessions from May 19, 1981, to June 18, 1981; from September 30, 1981, to October 2, 1981; from November 9, 1981, to March 10, 1983; from March 23, 1983, to June 20, 1984; and from October 16, 1984, to October 10, 1985.  The Parti Québécois government was led by Premier René Lévesque for most of the mandate, and by Pierre-Marc Johnson for a few months prior to the 1985 election. The Liberal opposition was led by Claude Ryan, by interim Liberal leader Gérard D. Levesque, and then by Robert Bourassa.

Seats per political party

 After the 1981 elections

Member list

This was the list of members of the National Assembly of Quebec that were elected in the 1981 election:

Other elected MNAs

Other MNAs were elected in by-elections during this mandate

 Réjean Doyon, Quebec Liberal Party, Louis-Hébert, April 5, 1982 
 Germain Leduc, Quebec Liberal Party, Saint-Laurent, April 5, 1982 
 Marc-Yvan Côté, Quebec Liberal Party, Charlesbourg, June 20, 1983 
 Ghislain Maltais, Quebec Liberal Party, Saguenay, June 20, 1983 
 Serge Champagne, Quebec Liberal Party, Saint-Jacques, June 20, 1983 
 Aline Saint-Amand, Quebec Liberal Party, Jonquière, December 5, 1983 
 Madeleine Bélanger, Quebec Liberal Party, Mégantic-Compton, December 5, 1983 
 Gilles Fortin, Quebec Liberal Party, Marguerite-Bourgeoys, June 18, 1984 
 Marcel Parent, Quebec Liberal Party, Sauvé, June 18, 1984 
 Jean-François Viau, Quebec Liberal Party, Saint-Jacques, November 26, 1984 
 Robert Bourassa, Quebec Liberal Party, Bertrand (Montérégie), June 3, 1985 
 Claude Trudel, Quebec Liberal Party, Bourget, June 3, 1985 
 Jean-Guy Gervais, Quebec Liberal Party, L'Assomption, June 3, 1985 
 Paul Philibert, Quebec Liberal Party, Trois-Rivières, June 3, 1985

Cabinet Ministers

Levesque Cabinet (1981-1985)

 Prime Minister and Executive Council President: René Lévesque
 Deputy Premier: Jacques-Yvan Morin (1981–1984), Camille Laurin (1984), Marc-André Bédard (1984–1985)
 Agriculture, Fisheries and Food: Jean Garon
 Labor, Workforce and Revenue Security: Raynald Fréchette (1981–1982)
 Labor: Raynald Fréchette (1982–1985)
 Workforce and Revenue Security: Pierre Marois (1982–1983), Pauline Marois (1983–1985)
 Employment: Robert Dean (1984–1985)
 Public Works and Provisioning: Alain Marcoux (1981–1984)
 Administration: Yves Bérubé (1981–1982), Michel Clair (1984–1985)
 Administration Reform: Yves Bérubé (1982–1984)
 Public Office: Denise Leblanc (1981–1984)
 Cultural Affairs: Clément Richard
 Cultural and Science Development: Jacques-Yvan Morin (1981–1982), Gerald Godin (1982)
 Cultural Communities and Immigration: Gérald Godin (1981–1984, 1984–1985), Louise Harel (1984), Pierre-Marc Johnson (1984)
 Social Affairs: Pierre-Marc Johnson (1981–1984), Camille Laurin (1984), Michel Clair (1984), Guy Chevrette (1984–1985)
 Health and Social Services: Guy Chevrette (1985)
 Social Development: Denis Lazure (1981–1982)
 Family Policies: Yves Beaumier (1985)
 Status of Women : Pauline Marois (1981–1983, 1985), Denise Leblanc (1983–1984), René Lévesque (1984–1985), Francine Lalonde (1985)
 Language Affairs: Gérald Godin (1984)
 Education: Camille Laurin (1981–1984), Yves Bérubé (1984), François Gendron (1984)
 Science and Technology:Gilbert Paquette (1982–1984), Yves Bérubé (1984)
 Superior Education in Science and Technology: Yves Bérubé (1984–1985)
 Recreation, Hunting and Fishing: Lucien Lessard (1981–1982), Guy Chevrette (1982–1984), Jacques Brassard (1984–1985)
 Transportation: Michel Clair (1981–1984), Jacques Léonard (1984), Guy Tardif (1984–1985)
 Communications: Jean-François Bertrand
 Relations with Citizens: Denis Lazure (1982–1984), Élie Fallu (1984–1985)
 Municipal Affairs:Jacques Léonard (1981–1984), Alain Marcoux (1984–1985)
 Environment: Marcel Léger (1981–1982), Adrien Ouellette (1982–1985)
 Energy and Resources: Yves Duhaime (1981–1984), Jean-Guy Rodrigue (1984)
 Forests: Jean-Pierre Jolivet (1984–1985)
 Intergovernmental Affairs: Claude Morin (1981–1982), Jacques-Yvan Morin (1982–1984)
 Canadian Intergovernmental Affairs: Pierre-Marc Johnson (1984–1985)
 International Relations: Bernard Landry (1984–1985)
 Electoral reform: Marc-André Bedard
 Parliamentary Affairs: Claude Charron
 Industry, Commerce and Tourism: Rodrigue Biron (1981–1984)
 Industry and Commerce: Rodrigue Biron (1984–1985)
 Tourism: Marcel Léger (1984–1985)
 Planning: François Gendron (1981–1982)
 Planning and Regional Development: François Gendron (1982–1984)
 Development and Regional Roads: Henri Lemay (1984–1985)
 Housing and Consumer's Protection: Guy Tardif (1981–1984), Jacques Rochefort (1984–1985)
 Justice: Marc-André Bédard (1981–1984), Pierre-Marc Johnson (1984–1985)
 Finances: Jacques Parizeau (1981–1984), Yves Duhaime (1984–1985)
 President of the Treasury Board: Yves Bérubé (1981–1984), Michel Clair (1984–1985)
 Revenue: Raynald Fréchette (1981–1982), Alain Marcoux (1982–1984), Robert Dean (1984), Maurice Martel (1984–1985)
 Financial Institutions and Cooperatives: Jacques Parizeau (1981–1982)
 Economic Development: Bernard Landry (1981–1982)
 Foreign Trade:Bernard Landry (1982–1985)

Johnson Cabinet (1985)

 Prime Minister and Executive Council President: Pierre-Marc Johnson
 Deputy Premier: Marc-Andre Bédard
 Agriculture, Fisheries and Food: Jean Garon
 Labor: Raynald Fréchette
 Workforce and Revenue Security: Pauline Marois
 Employment: Robert Dean
 Administration: Michel Clair
 Cultural Affairs: Clement Richard (1985), Gerald Godin (1985)
 Cultural Communities and Immigration: Gérald Godin (1985), Élie Fallu (1985)
 Health and Social Services:Guy Chevrette
 Family Policies: Yves Beaumier
 Status of Women : Pauline Marois (1985), Lise Denis (1985)
 Education: Francois Gendron
 Superior Education in Science and Technology: Yves Bérubé (1985), Jean-Guy Rodrigue (1985)
 Recreation, Hunting and Fishing: Jacques Brassard
 Transportation: Guy Tardif (1985)
 Communications: Jean-François Bertrand
 Relations with Citizens: Elie Fallu (1985), Rollande Cloutier (1985)
 Municipal Affairs:Alain Marcoux
 Environment: Adrien Ouellette
 Energy and Resources: Jean-Guy Rodrigue (1985), Michel Clair (1985)
 Forests: Jean-Pierre Jolivet
 Canadian Intergovernmental Affairs: Pierre-Marc Johnson
 International Relations: Bernard Landry (1985), Louise Beaudoin (1985)
 Electoral reform: Marc-André Bédard
 Industry and Commerce: Rodrigue Biron
 Tourism: Marcel Leger
 Planning: Alain Marcoux
 Development and Regional Roads: Henri Lemay
 Housing and Consumer's Protection: Jacques Rochefort (1985)
 Justice: Raynald Fréchette
 Solicitor General: Marc-André Bédard
 Finances: Yves Duhaime (1985), Bernard Landry (1985)
 President of the Treasury Board: Michel Clair
 Revenue: Maurice Martel
 Foreign Trade: Bernard Landry (1985), Jean-Guy Parent (1985)

New electoral districts

A electoral map reform was made in 1985 and implemented in the elections later that year.

 Maisonneuve was renamed Hochelaga-Maisonneuve.
 Nicolet was renamed Nicolet-Yamaska.

References
 1981 election results
 List of Historical Cabinet Ministers (Page 3)
 List of Historical Cabinet Ministers (Page 4)

Notes

32